The 2011 Canada Masters (also known as the 2011 Rogers Cup presented by National Bank and the 2011 Rogers Cup for sponsorship reasons) was a tennis tournament played on outdoor hard courts in Canada. It was the 122nd edition of the Canada Masters (110th for the women), and was part of the ATP World Tour Masters 1000 of the 2011 ATP World Tour, and of the Premier Series of the 2011 WTA Tour. The women's and legends event was held at the Rexall Centre in Toronto, Canada and the men's event took place at the Uniprix Stadium in Montreal, Canada, from August 8 to August 14.

Finals

Men's singles

 Novak Djokovic defeated  Mardy Fish, 6–2, 3–6, 6–4
 It was Djokovic's 9th title of the year and 27th of his career. It was his 5th Masters 1000 of the year and 10th of his career. It was his second win at the Rogers Cup, winning in 2007. The No. 1 of the world was 53 of 54 wins in the season.

Women's singles

 Serena Williams defeated  Samantha Stosur, 6–4, 6–2
It was Williams' 2nd title of the year and 39th of her career. It was her 2nd title in Canada, also winning in 2001.

Men's doubles

 Michaël Llodra /  Nenad Zimonjić defeated  Bob Bryan /  Mike Bryan, 6–4, 6–7(5–7), [10–5]

Women's doubles

 Liezel Huber /  Lisa Raymond defeated  Victoria Azarenka /  Maria Kirilenko, walkover

Points and prize money

Point distribution

Prize money
All money is in C$:

ATP entrants

Seeds

 Seedings are based on the rankings of August 1, 2011.

Other entrants
The following players received wildcards into the singles main draw:
  Érik Chvojka
  Ernests Gulbis
  Vasek Pospisil
  Bernard Tomic

The following players received entry from the qualifying draw:

  Alex Bogomolov Jr.
  Flavio Cipolla
  Alejandro Falla
  Tobias Kamke
  Philipp Petzschner
  Michael Russell
  Michael Yani

The following players received entry from a lucky loser spot:
  Lu Yen-hsun

Withdrawals
  David Ferrer (wrist injury)
  Guillermo García López (appendicitis) 
  Xavier Malisse (personal reason) 
  Jürgen Melzer (quad injury) 
  Peter Polansky (groin injury) 
  Milos Raonic (hip injury) 
  Andy Roddick (oblique injury) 
  Robin Söderling (wrist injury)

WTA entrants

Seeds

 Seedings are based on the rankings of August 1, 2011.

Other entrants
The following players received wildcards into the singles main draw
  Eugenie Bouchard
  Stéphanie Dubois
  Aleksandra Wozniak

The following players received entry from the qualifying draw:

  Gréta Arn
  Iveta Benešová
  Alberta Brianti
  Simona Halep
  Polona Hercog
  Bojana Jovanovski
  Petra Martić
  María José Martínez Sánchez
  Galina Voskoboeva
  Kathrin Wörle
  Zhang Shuai
  Zheng Jie

The following players received entry from a lucky loser spot:
  Lourdes Domínguez Lino

Withdrawals
  Venus Williams (Viral Illness)

References

External links
Official website

 
2011 ATP World Tour
2011 WTA Tour
August 2011 sports events in Canada
2011